Cantuaria is a genus of South Pacific armored trapdoor spiders that was first described by Henry Roughton Hogg in 1902. From 1985 to 2006 it was merged with former genus Misgolas, now Arbanitis.

Species
 it contains forty-three species:

Cantuaria abdita Forster, 1968 – New Zealand
Cantuaria allani Forster, 1968 – New Zealand
Cantuaria aperta Forster, 1968 – New Zealand
Cantuaria apica Forster, 1968 – New Zealand
Cantuaria assimilis Forster, 1968 – New Zealand
Cantuaria borealis Forster, 1968 – New Zealand
Cantuaria catlinensis Forster, 1968 – New Zealand
Cantuaria cognata Forster, 1968 – New Zealand
Cantuaria collensis (Todd, 1945) – New Zealand
Cantuaria delli Forster, 1968 – New Zealand
Cantuaria dendyi (Hogg, 1901) (type) – New Zealand
Cantuaria depressa Forster, 1968 – New Zealand
Cantuaria dunedinensis Forster, 1968 – New Zealand
Cantuaria gilliesi (O. Pickard-Cambridge, 1878) – New Zealand
Cantuaria grandis Forster, 1968 – New Zealand
Cantuaria huttoni (O. Pickard-Cambridge, 1880) – New Zealand
Cantuaria insulana Forster, 1968 – New Zealand
Cantuaria isolata Forster, 1968 – New Zealand
Cantuaria johnsi Forster, 1968 – New Zealand
Cantuaria kakahuensis Forster, 1968 – New Zealand
Cantuaria kakanuiensis Forster, 1968 – New Zealand
Cantuaria lomasi Forster, 1968 – New Zealand
Cantuaria magna Forster, 1968 – New Zealand
Cantuaria marplesi (Todd, 1945) – New Zealand
Cantuaria maxima Forster, 1968 – New Zealand
Cantuaria medialis Forster, 1968 – New Zealand
Cantuaria mestoni (Hickman, 1928) – Australia (Tasmania)
Cantuaria minor Forster, 1968 – New Zealand
Cantuaria myersi Forster, 1968 – New Zealand
Cantuaria napua Forster, 1968 – New Zealand
Cantuaria orepukiensis Forster, 1968 – New Zealand
Cantuaria parrotti Forster, 1968 – New Zealand
Cantuaria pilama Forster, 1968 – New Zealand
Cantuaria prina Forster, 1968 – New Zealand
Cantuaria reducta Forster, 1968 – New Zealand
Cantuaria secunda Forster, 1968 – New Zealand
Cantuaria sinclairi Forster, 1968 – New Zealand
Cantuaria stephenensis Forster, 1968 – New Zealand
Cantuaria stewarti (Todd, 1945) – New Zealand
Cantuaria sylvatica Forster, 1968 – New Zealand
Cantuaria toddae Forster, 1968 – New Zealand
Cantuaria vellosa Forster, 1968 – New Zealand
Cantuaria wanganuiensis (Todd, 1945) – New Zealand

See also
 List of Idiopidae species

References

External links

Idiopidae
Mygalomorphae genera
Spiders of New Zealand